Dhaulagiri II is a mountain in Gandaki Province, Nepal. Dhaulagiri II is the second highest mountain in the Dhaulagiri mountain range and it was first climbed by an Austrian-American expedition from its northwest side.

Geography 
It is part of the Dhaulagiri mountain range in north-central Nepal, and Dhaulagiri II is the second highest mountain in the mountain range.

Climbing history 
In 1955, Dhaulagiri II was approached by J. O. M. Roberts and others. In 1963, an Austrian expedition attempted to ascend Dhaulagiri II from Dhaulagiri V which were among the last unclimbed seven-thousanders. However, they only managed to reach . Two years later, a Japanese expedition was also unsuccessful due to a avalanche. On 18 May 1971, Dhaulagiri II was first climbed by Adolf Huber, Ronald Fear, Adi Weissensteiner, and Jangbu Sherpa during an Austrian-American expedition via its northwest side. On 8 May 1975, the second successful climb was made by ten Japanese men by using a new route from the Tsaurabong Glacier. In 1982, a French expedition led by François Imbert using a new route, however, they abandoned the mountain after reaching  on 19 October due to heavy snow which posed a threat for an avalanche.

References

External links 

 Dhaulagiri II at Nepal Himal Peak Profile

Seven-thousanders of the Himalayas
Mountains of the Gandaki Province